The 13th César Awards ceremony, presented by the Académie des Arts et Techniques du Cinéma, honoured the best French films of 1987 and took place on 12 March 1988 at the Palais des Congrès in Paris. The ceremony was chaired by Miloš Forman and hosted by Michel Drucker and Jane Birkin. Au revoir les enfants won the award for Best Film.

Winners and nominees

See also
 60th Academy Awards
 41st British Academy Film Awards

References

External links
 Official website
 
 13th César Awards at AlloCiné

1988
1988 film awards
Cesar